The 1914 Maryville Scots football team represented the Maryville College during the 1914 college football season.

Schedule

References

Maryville
Maryville Scots football seasons
Maryville Scots football